Ralph Noel Peverill (25 December 1907 – 21 October 1997) was a former Australian rules footballer who played with Carlton in the Victorian Football League (VFL).

Peverill played a single game for Carlton while studying dentistry at the University of Melbourne.

He later served in the Australian Army during World War II, rising to the rank of Lieutenant-Colonel.

Peverill later became the Director of the Perth Dental Hospital.

Notes

External links 

Noel Peverill's profile at Blueseum

1907 births
1997 deaths
Carlton Football Club players
University Blacks Football Club players
Australian rules footballers from Victoria (Australia)